The Yangjiang Group is a Chinese artist collective founded in 2002 by Zheng Guogu (born 1970), Chen Zaiyan (born 1971), and Sun Qinglin (born 1974). The group's name takes after their hometown in Yangjiang, Guangdong Province. The Yangjiang Group's works have been exhibited in Europe and Asia. Their works show a strong attachment to a sense of place in their hometown.

Themes and practice 
The collective method of work follows other Chinese art groups such as the Big Tail Elephants. The Yangjiang Group's works are noted for their apolitical content, non-representational method of expression, and unabashed refutation and criticism of political analysis of Chinese contemporary art. Xiao Fengxia attributed the aniconism of their works to a degree of political autonomy from Beijing in Guangdong Province: "Far away from the hierarchal chronotope of Beijing, southern China drifts away from the center…the local people's innovative spirit, lifestyles, and political feelings are unique, and do not completely follow Beijing... Southern China's economic boom, especially in Hong Kong, Shenzhen, and Guangzhou in the Pearl River Delta Region... led to unprecedented growth in prosperity that overturned orthodox Socialist thought".

The Yangjiang Group work primarily with calligraphy, but also other mediums such as video and wax sculpture. The group frequently combines various mediums that engages many different senses, and with special attention to the relationship among the work of art, the audience, and the gallery space. Their works are often done impromptu, to erase the distance between a work of art and the lived experience, where "life itself becomes an integral part of their art".

The Yangjiang Group draws from classical Chinese practice of experiencing works of art where audience participation is essential, as noted by Lisa Catt. The group also addresses the issue of commoditization of art that enables a work of art to take on a new meaning, and lose its ability to dictate culture as a result. The group continue to work in their hometown in Yangjiang, where they promote the local art scenes in southern China to counterbalance the financial potential of contemporary art from Beijing and Shanghai.

Works

Wax Series 
The Wax Series comprises Waterfall (2002), Pond (2003) and Garden of Pine – Also Fiercer than Tiger II (2010). 

Made almost entirely from wax, Zheng Guogu explained that the dripping movement of wax shows the infinite dimension of physical objects. In addition, the work calls into question the comparative meaning of wax in Chinese and Western culture. The work combines calligraphy written by ordinary people to show the kinetic nature of the art of calligraphy.

Yangjiang Group: Actions for Tomorrow
Yangjiang Group: Actions for Tomorrow was a show in 4A Centre for Contemporary Asian Art in Chinatown, Sydney, over the period of the 2015 Chinese New Year. Reflecting on the exhibition's content, curator of the centre Melissa Chiu said, "Guangzhou has neither the political centrality of Beijing nor the economic history of Shanghai. Guangzhou's location is determined solely by opportunity for economic prosperity". Works which debuted in this exhibition included:

Drinking Tea at Work, for which participants are invited to sit down in the space to perform the tea ceremony and savor tea.
Calligraphy After the Meal. a performance by the artists that utilizes a large sheet spread on the floor. Artists write a long calligraphy inscription in turn. During the performance, the artists engage in conversation that is aestheticized to become part of the "artwork."

Shang-ti is Dead! Yet, the Yuan is Very Much Alive!; Shang-ti is the Chinese concept of a divine being, which differs from the Western concept of God. The work has been interpreted as revealing the contradiction between the espousal of Socialist values and economic pragmatism in contemporary China. The Yangjiang Group has been vocal that they do not agree with this reading of the work. The Yangjiang Group explains:Chinese property buyers poured a large amount of money into Sydney... new changes lead to such conflicts being expressed in this [Australian] society (中国的房地产商带来了大量的资金，涌进了悉尼……新的变化让这种冲突在这个社会里边呈现出来。)

Exhibitions 
 2013-2014: "Fuck off the Rules: Yangjiang Group," Minsheng Art Museum, Shanghai, China. 8 November 2013 - 22 February 2014
 2015: "Yangjiang Group: Actions for Tomorrow," 4A Centre for Contemporary Asian Art, Sydney, Australia. 17 January – 7 March 2015
 2016-2017: "Tales of Our Time," Solomon Guggenheim Museum, New York, United States. 4 November 2016 - 10 March 2017

References 

21st-century Chinese artists
Chinese artist groups and collectives
Artists from Guangdong
People from Yangjiang